Phlyctimantis verrucosus is a species of frog in the family Hyperoliidae. It is found in central and eastern Democratic Republic of the Congo, northern Rwanda, and southern and western Uganda. It might be the same species as Phlyctimantis leonardi found further west, showing clinal variation; in any case, the border between these two species is not well known.

It is associated with secondary and edge habitats, and occurs in degraded areas, including farm bush. There are no significant threats to this generally common species.

References

Verrucosus
Frogs of Africa
Amphibians of the Republic of the Congo
Amphibians of Rwanda
Amphibians of Uganda
Amphibians described in 1912
Taxa named by George Albert Boulenger
Taxonomy articles created by Polbot